Driscoll Catholic High School was a private college preparatory high school in the village of Addison, Illinois. It had been accredited by the State of Illinois and the North Central Association of Colleges and Schools.

Founded in 1966, Driscoll brought Catholic secondary education to Addison, Illinois. Its primary claim to fame is in the field of athletics. The Driscoll Catholic football team has won 8 state championships, including seven in a row (2001–07) which stands as a high school record in the State of Illinois.

Driscoll was a member of the Lasallian Schools Association and the Roman Catholic Diocese of Joliet in Illinois. Athletically, Driscoll competed in the Suburban Catholic Conference. Driscoll's football team won seven consecutive state championships from 2001 to 2007 (six being 4A and one as 3A) to establish a state record.

Athletics 
Driscoll competed in the Suburban Catholic Conference, and as a member of the Illinois High School Association (IHSA), which sponsored State Championship tournaments in many sports (generally in the smaller or middle classes of competition). Driscoll Catholic had one of the best high school football programs in the state of Illinois.

The school sponsored interscholastic teams for men and women in basketball, cross country, golf, soccer, and track & field. Men would usually compete in baseball, bowling, football, ice hockey, and wrestling. Women would usually compete in cheerleading, dance, softball, and volleyball.

Driscoll has placed in the top four of the following IHSA State Championship Tournaments:

 Baseball: 3rd place (1990–91, 2005–06); 2nd place (1999–2000); State Champions (1991–92, 1993–94, 1996–97)
 Basketball (girls): State Champions (2008–09)
 Football: State Champions (1991–92, 2001–02, 2002–03, 2003–04, 2004–05, 2005–06, 2006–07, 2007-08)

Notably, in football, Driscoll's 8 state titles was the fourth most in Illinois high school history. The string of seven consecutive state titles was by far the Illinois high school record, with no other team winning more than five in a row.

Closing 
It was announced on April 2, 2009 that Driscoll Catholic would close its doors at the end of the 2009 school year due to low enrollment and a lack of funds.

Driscoll students, alumni, faculty, staff, and friends worked to raise funds and keep the school open. On April 19, 2009, the Chicago Tribune reported that even if fund raising efforts are successful, there was a concern that the school could fall short of the minimum enrollment needed to keep the school open.

On April 28, 2009, the Chicago Tribune reported that the De La Salle Christian Brothers of the Midwest had sent an e-mail to students and families announcing that even if enough money were to be raised to keep the school open, it would be closing at the end of the year.

References

External links 
 Driscoll Catholic High School official website

Illinois
Addison, Illinois
Former high schools in Illinois
Educational institutions established in 1966
Educational institutions disestablished in 2009
Roman Catholic Diocese of Joliet in Illinois
Defunct Catholic secondary schools in Illinois
Schools in DuPage County, Illinois
1966 establishments in Illinois